The Battle of Koromo River took place during the opening years of the Kamakura period (12th century) of Japan.

After the destruction of the Heike, Minamoto no Yoshitsune conflicted with his brother Minamoto no Yoritomo, and fled into Hiraizumi, Mutsu Province.  He was sheltered by Northern Fujiwara's 3rd ruler Fujiwara no Hidehira.  Hidehira appointed Yoshitsune as general to be opposed to Yoritomo, but he died of illness on October 29, 1187.

Yoritomo strongly pressured Fujiwara no Yasuhira, the 2nd son and successor of Hidehira, through the Imperial Court to arrest Yoshitsune.  Against the will of his father, Yasuhira succumbed to the repeated pressure of Yoritomo.  On June 15, 1189, he led 500 soldiers to attack Yoshitsune and an entourage of servants in the Koromogawa no tachi residence.  Yasuhira defeated Yoshitsune and his compatriot, Saitō no Musashibō Benkei.  Throughout the battle, Benkei defended his lord.  Benkei supposedly died standing up, which caused great fear in his enemies.  Yoshitsune himself committed suicide at the end of the battle.

References

1180s in Japan
1189 in Asia
Koromo River
Koromo River